The 14th British Academy Video Game Awards hosted by the British Academy of Film and Television Arts on 12 April 2018 at Troxy honoured the best video games of 2017. It was hosted by Dara Ó Briain, who had previously hosted the 12th ceremony in 2016.

Category changes 
For the 13th ceremony, one new category was introduced. The Game Beyond Entertainment Award will be awarded to celebrate games that have a profound social impact. An official statement from BAFTA explains that the category will award

Nominations 
On 21 February 2018, it was announced that Tim Schafer, founder of Double Fine Productions, would be awarded the Fellowship award, the highest honour BAFTA can bestow. The nominations for other awards were announced on 15 March 2018.

Awards 
The awards were presented on 12 April 2018.

BAFTA Fellowship
Tim Schafer

Games with multiple nominations and wins

Nominations

Wins

References 

British Academy Games Awards ceremonies
British Academy Games
British Academy Games
British Academy Games